Evaristo de Toledo Piza (born 27 July 1972) is a Brazilian football coach and former player who played as a midfielder. He is the current head coach of Sampaio Corrêa.

Honours

Manager
Capivariano
 Campeonato Paulista Série A2: 2014

Botafogo-PB
 Campeonato Paraibano: 2019

References

External links
 Tuddo profile 
 

1972 births
Living people
People from Campinas
Footballers from São Paulo (state)
Brazilian footballers
Association football midfielders
Ituano FC players
Olímpia Futebol Clube players
Khaleej FC players
Moto Club de São Luís players
Deportivo Pereira footballers
Club Alianza Lima footballers
Comercial Futebol Clube (Ribeirão Preto) players
Brazilian expatriate footballers
Brazilian expatriate sportspeople in Saudi Arabia
Brazilian expatriate sportspeople in Colombia
Brazilian expatriate sportspeople in Peru
Expatriate footballers in Saudi Arabia
Expatriate footballers in Colombia
Expatriate footballers in Peru
Brazilian football managers
Campeonato Brasileiro Série C managers
Associação Atlética Portuguesa (Santos) managers
Esporte Clube Taubaté managers
Capivariano Futebol Clube managers
Guarani FC managers
Mirassol Futebol Clube managers
Esporte Clube XV de Novembro (Piracicaba) managers
Botafogo Futebol Clube (PB) managers
América Futebol Clube (RN) managers
Manaus Futebol Clube managers
Sampaio Corrêa Futebol Clube managers
Agremiação Sportiva Arapiraquense managers
Brazilian expatriate football managers
Brazilian expatriate sportspeople in Japan
Expatriate football managers in Japan